The R160 is a class of New Technology subway cars built for the New York City Subway's B Division. Entering service between 2006 and 2010, they replaced all R38, R40/A, and NYCT-operated R44 cars, and most R32 and R42 cars. The R160s are very similar to the earlier R143s and later R179s. The biggest difference between them is the Flexible Information and Notice Display (FIND) system on the R160s in place of static LED maps on the R143s and all A-Division New Technology fleet.

In total, 1,662 cars comprise the R160 class, which consists of two models, the 1,002 Alstom-built R160A cars and the 660 Kawasaki-built R160B cars. The R160A cars are organized in two different configurations, with 372 cars arranged in four-car sets and 630 cars arranged in five-car sets. All R160B cars are in five-car sets, but are subdivided by which propulsion system they use; the majority use the Alstom ONIX propulsion system that are also found on the R160A cars, while the rest use Siemens SITRAC propulsion.

Kawasaki had little to no problems in delivering the R160B cars, which entered service on August 17, 2006. Alstom was behind the delivery schedule early on for the R160As, which first ran on October 17, 2006. The Metropolitan Transportation Authority exercised options for both contracts, and by June 2010, all R160 cars were in service. Numerous experimental features were added to the R160s through the 2010s. 64 R160A cars were fitted with communications-based train control (CBTC) equipment installed for service on the Canarsie Line ( train), and the majority of the remaining fleet has CBTC equipment installed for service on the Queens Boulevard Line (and  trains).

Description

There are two versions of the R160: the R160A (built by Alstom, numbered 8313–8712, 9233–9802, & 9943–9974) and the R160B (built by Kawasaki, numbered 8713–9232 & 9803–9942). The two-car types are nearly identical to each other, and differ only in a few ways; both can interoperate with each other. The R160As and the majority of the R160Bs utilize the same traction motors as the R142s, while the rest of the R160Bs utilize traction motors similar to those tested on R143s 8205–8212.

The R160 cars are configured in either four-car sets or five-car sets. 372 R160A cars (8313–8652 & 9943–9974) are configured as four-car sets. All are maintained at East New York Yard for the BMT Eastern Division (/, and ).

The R160A base order was part of a $961,687,121 contract funded in part by a grant from the Federal Transit Administration. The primary base order of the R160 class consisted of 660 cars, 400 R160As to be built by Alstom, and the remaining 260 R160Bs to be built by Kawasaki. The contract included options for further orders, which, if exercised, would have brought the total business with NYCT to about US$2.4 billion, for 1,700 subway cars, and Kawasaki would have manufactured 40% (680 cars) of the 1,700 cars. The R160 fleet was purchased at an average cost of $2.0 million USD per car.

Features

The R160s are very similar to the R143s and R179s, but all three have technical differences. Initially, none of the three were able to interoperate, but modifications made in 2022 with the R143s and the four-car sets of R160As have allowed the two to operate together in one train.

The R160s are equipped with regenerative braking, which allows the cars to capture the braking energy as trains enter a station and transfer it to trains on nearby tracks.

One of the major changes and highlights of the new cars is the addition of an electronic "FIND" (Flexible Information and Notice Display) system, which includes an LCD screen displaying the route, route information, and advertisements, and a tri-color (red, yellow, green) LED strip map which displays the next ten stations, plus five consecutive "further stops" to riders. There are three of these in every car. The display updates the stations at every stop, also giving the number of stops to each station listed. The FIND system replaces a plastic card that had a set route and stations printed on, which was used on the R142, R142A, R143, and R188 subway cars, each of which has 64 amber LED dot station indicators. This allows for instant route or line changes with the correct information, which includes, but is not limited to, the omitting of certain stops.

Experimental features

As part of a 2010 pilot program to increase security and capacity, R160B cars 8713–8722 tested folding seats, CCTV, pivoted grabhandles, and looped stanchions. Following passenger complaints and Kawasaki's refusal to test the same equipment on a set of R142 cars, the program was canceled in 2012 and the equipment was removed. Some of the remaining grabhandles and folding seats from the program have been reused to address a state of emergency in 2017, but have been the subject of vandalism.

R160A cars 9798–9802 were equipped with looped stanchions and double the number of poles, the former feature which was first seen on R160Bs 8713–8722. These features were later added in several other R160 cars during refurbishment, in order to address the 2017 New York City transit crisis.

In 2016, a non-advertised pilot program saw 20 R160 trainsets based out of Jamaica Yard testing onboard WiFi. That same year, many cars had their Arts for Transit boards replaced with LCD information screens to display public safety announcements, advertisements, and trivia. These screens are similar to the ones onboard all R143 cars; however, they can display a range of colors instead of just red, orange, and green.

In 2018, R160A car 8395 had its truck suspension system replaced with carbon fiber reinforced plastic "efWING" leaf springs from Kawasaki, to determine the feasibility of them replacing the heavier coil spring suspension found on all other R160s. R160B car 9116 was also equipped with the new suspension.

In September 2020, a set of R160s received digital display advertising as a pilot test. This is similar to the digital advertising found on R188 cars 7847–7848. Multiple R160s have since had these screens installed in place of the paper advertisements.

The R160 cars began to receive CCTV Security Cameras in mid 2022, as part of a new pilot program to combat the recent rise of vandalism within the subway system.

Communications-based train control 
There are current and future use cases for communications-based train control with the R160 cars.

64 R160As (8313–8376) have CBTC equipment installed for use on the Canarsie Line , alongside already-equipped R143 cars.

R160As 8313–8316 and 8377–8380 were temporarily taken out of service to test equipment between Bergen Street and Church Avenue on the express tracks of the IND Culver Line, and have returned to service with the equipment removed.

The remaining 4-car sets will be equipped with CBTC for $11.9 million by November 2021 for use on the Eighth Avenue Line.

History

Construction
On July 31, 2002, it was announced that New York City Transit awarded a $961,687,121 contract to Alstom for 660 new cars, with two new options that could provide for a total of 1,040 cars. Kawasaki and Alstom organized a joint venture called Alskaw Inc. for project management, engineering, and equipment purchasing to pursue the contract, and to allow for operational compatibility with the R143s, which were built by Kawasaki. The two companies built and delivered the rolling stock through the joint venture. Kawasaki not only manufactured 260 cars for the base contract but was also the engineering leader for the whole project and provided the trucks for all cars. Alstom assembled 1002 R160A cars at its manufacturing plant in Hornell, New York, while Kawasaki assembled 660 R160B cars at its plant in Yonkers, New York. Shells for the Alstom-built cars were built in their Lapa plant, in São Paulo, Brazil, and shells for the Kawasaki-built cars were assembled at their Lincoln, Nebraska plant. The base order consisted of 660 cars, the first option included 620 cars, and the second option included 382 cars.

Delivery
Early on in the order, Alstom encountered significant start-up production problems since being awarded the base contract. In July 2005, Alstom missed its contractual deadline to deliver the 10-car test train, which arrived five months late with Alstom requesting three additional months to deliver the test train. In addition, the Transit Authority rejected several car shells made earlier at their plant in Lapa, Brazil, near São Paulo, after discovering welding defects.

The first 5-car set of R160As (8653–8657) was delivered on November 29, 2005, and the next remaining five cars (8658–8662) were delivered on December 6, 2005, to the New York City Transit Authority, forming a complete 10-car train for acceptance testing and evaluation.

The first train of R160Bs (8713–8722) was delivered on July 22, 2005.

While Kawasaki had few or no problems in delivering the R160Bs, Alstom was behind on its delivery schedule early on in the R160A order. Alstom was to deliver 200 out of the 400-car base order by September 2007. However, by that month, Alstom had only delivered 80 cars. Under the base contract, Alstom agreed to pay damages of $800 a day for late deliveries of four-car trains, and $1000 a day for five-car trains, though the Transit Authority had not yet fined Alstom for its late deliveries and was actually negotiating with Alstom to accelerate their delivery schedule. The 200 cars were finally delivered 7 months late in early April 2008.

On November 10, 2008, the MTA exercised options for 140 R160B cars (9803–9942) and 242 R160A cars, broken down into 32 cars arranged as 4-car sets (9943–9974) and 210 cars arranged in 5-car sets (9593–9802).

The option order cars were delivered starting in late 2009, and the final cars were delivered on May 6, 2010. By June 2010, all R160A and R160B cars were in revenue service.

Post-delivery incidents and refurbishments

After Hurricane Sandy, R160B set 8738–8742 was damaged and required an extensive electrical reconstruction at Coney Island Shops. In March 2016, the set underwent pre-service testing and finally returned to service in fall 2016.

In response to the 2017 New York City transit crisis, the R160s have seen mass refurbishments. A majority of the R160s have been given LED interior lighting, yellow-painted looped stanchions, traffic flow signage, and LCD information screens (that replaced the Ars-for-Transit cards). Some R160s have been also been deep-cleaned. Twenty 5-car sets (100 cars) assigned to the E received the same features, however the seats at the end of the cars were removed to increase capacity. To identify these cars, they were given interior artwork and exterior wrapping.  Four 4-car sets (16 cars) assigned to the L were also given the same exterior wrapping, LED interior lighting, yellow-painted looped stanchions, traffic flow signage, and LCD information screens (that replaced the Art-for-Transit cards), plus folding seats and pivoted grabhandles previously tested in 2010. Passengers sometimes vandalize the seats when they are locked in the up position during rush hours.

After Hurricane Ida, R160B set 9108–9112 was damaged and required an extensive electrical reconstruction at Coney Island Shops. It was moved to the shops on September 22, 2021 and has not returned to service at this time.

Notes

References

External links

 nycsubway.org: R160 cars
 
 
 
 Kawasaki Rail Car, Inc.: R160B

New York City Subway rolling stock
Train-related introductions in 2006
Alstom multiple units
Kawasaki multiple units